Indore Junction (station code: INDB) is one of the Railway junctions in Madhya Pradesh and serves Indore, the commercial capital of Central India. The railway station of Indore Junction BG (future Indore Central) falls under the administrative control of Western Railway zone of Indian Railways. It consists of six main railway platforms. The Ujjain–Indore route and Indore Junction was electrified in 2011. The Station is located 1 km away from the city centre. It is one of the ISO Certified Railway Stations of India.

History

Holkar State Railway 
His Highness the Maharajah Holkar of Indore Sawai Shri Tukojirao Holkar II, in 1870, offered a loan of £10 million sterling for the construction of a rail-line to his capital city of Indore, taking off from the Great Indian Peninsula (G.I.P.) Railway main line. A quick survey was made and Khandwa on the G.I.P. line was chosen as junction point. The alignment was to pass through Sanawad, Kheree Ghat on the Narmada River and then by way of the Choral Valley up the slopes of the Vindhyas to Indore. Maharaja Holkar's contribution accelerated the construction of rail-lines in Malwa region.

During 1870s, a rail line of Holkar State Railway was sanctioned between Khandwa and Indore passing the Mhow Ghat. The Holkar Railway required very heavy works due to very steep gradients (up to 1 in 40) on the Vindhya Ghats. It also involved digging of 4 tunnels aggregating 510 yards in length, deep cuttings and heavy retaining walls. River Narmada was crossed by a bridge of 14 spans, 197 feet each and piers 80 feet above low water level. There are 14 other large bridges with high piers, the highest pier being 152 feet above the bottom of the ravine.
The first section Khandwa–Sanawad was opened for traffic on 1.12.1874. The Narmada Bridge was opened for traffic on 5.10.1876 by His Highness the Maharaja of Holkar who named it ‘Holkar-Narmada Bridge’.

Scindia–Neemuch Railway
Surveys between Indore and Neemuch started long back in 1871–72 when the plan and estimates for the whole project was submitted to the Government of India in 1872–73. Maharaja Jayajirao Scindia of Gwalior agreed to grant a loan of Rs. 7.5 million at 4 per cent per annum interest for the project and the railway was renamed as ‘Scindia–Neemuch Railway’. It also included a branch line to Ujjain from Indore. The Indore–Ujjain branch line was opened in August 1876 and the line was completed in 1879–80.

Bombay, Baroda and Central India Railway
During the period 1881-1882, the Holkar Railway and Scindia Neemuch Railway merged under a single management and were renamed Rajputana Malwa Railway. In 1882, Khandwa–Indore line extended to Ajmer. The identity of Rajputana Malwa Railway remained for a very short while and its management was taken over by Bombay, Baroda and Central India Railway Company on 1 January 1885 till 1951.

Western Railway
Indore railway station was reconstructed by B.B. & C.I.company in the year 1921. On 5 November 1951, Western Railway with its headquarters at Mumbai came into existence after merging of B.B. & C.I.Railway with the other State Railways and overtook the administration of Indore Junction. The broad-gauge portion was extended from Ujjain–Maksi–Indore in 1964–66 and the doubling of the Indore–Bhopal sections was completed in during 1993–2001.

Connectivity
The Indore Junction is connected with Ujjain Junction to the north west, Mhow Cantonment to the south, Dewas Junction to the north and Khandwa Junction to the south east. Being a junction station, it is well connected to Jaipur, Kota, Lucknow, Ahmedabad, Mumbai, Bhopal, Ujjain, Gwalior, Jabalpur, Rewa, Gadarwara, Betul, Katni, Chhindwara, Khandwa, Ratlam and Bina within the state.

The station is well-connected to major stations of India such as Mumbai, Ahmedabad, Nagpur, Kota, Dehradun, Kolkata, Jodhpur, Jammu, Bilaspur, Pune, Bangalore, Udaipur, Jhansi, Amritsar and Patna.

Electrification
Western Railway started the electrification of Ujjain–Indore & Dewas–Maksi in the period of 2007–08 & completed in June 2012. A trial run of a special inspection saloon was also conducted on the newly laid system build at a cost of Rs 70 crore.

Developments
The construction of two new platforms is done, which was approved earlier by the Western Railways (WR). The Indore railway station now has a modern station complex developed by the Western Railway's Ratlam railway division close to Rajkumar railway overbridge. This elevated structure would offer commuters space at the ground floor and have ticket booking counters, waiting halls, etc. on the first floor. The complex offer's sufficient parking facilities. The facility would be equipped with division's first underpass. A multi-storey parking facility is also under construction in the station premises. Now there are six platforms in Indore junction (BG). At present the conversion of Indore – Khandwa (meter-gauge) to (broad-gauge) rail line is in progress. A new line from Indore (Jn) to Dahod (Jn) is also work in progress. Both rail lines would be completed in years 2022 and 2023 respectively. Recently CCEA also Sanctioned Gadarwara(Narsinghpur) -Indore new rail line via Budni. This will decrease the distance between Indore and Jabalpur by 90 km. Also the Ministry of Shipping has approved Indore–Manmad Rail line. Then rail lines would increase the connectivity of Indore with Mumbai.

Suburban trains

The Indore Suburban Railway is a commuter rail system serving the Indore Metropolitan Region. It is operated by Indian Railways' zonal Western Railways (WR). It has the highest passenger density of any urban railway system in Madhya Pradesh. The trains plying on its routes are commonly referred to as local trains or simply as locals.

Major trains
These trains start from Indore Junction railway station:

See also 

 
 
 Bhopal Habibganj
 
 Indore-Dewas-Ujjain section
 Indore-Dahod line

References

External links

Ratlam Division, WR Website 

Railway junction stations in Madhya Pradesh
Railway stations in Indore
Ratlam railway division
Railway stations opened in 1921
1921 establishments in India
Buildings and structures in Indore